Anastas Georgiev Gerdzhikov (born 28 February 1963) is an associate professor of ancient literature and professor of ancient and medieval literature.

Anastas Gerdzhikov's research interests are in the field of Roman literature and the political theory of antiquity and the Middle Ages. He is the author of four monographs and over forty studies and articles in the field of ancient literature and the regulation of higher education. He is the author of the first Bulgarian translation of Aristotle's "Politics".

On 1 October 2021, at the opening of the academic year of Sofia University, Anastas Gerdzhikov announced that he would run for President of Bulgaria, nominated by an initiative committee of public figures. He was immediately supported by GERB. His running mate is Nevyana Miteva. He lost the second round to the incumbent president Rumen Radev.

References

1963 births
Classics educators
Classical philologists
People from Kardzhali
Bulgarian philologists
Rectors of Sofia University
Humboldt University of Berlin alumni
Living people
Candidates for President of Bulgaria